The  was a battle during the Sengoku period (16th century) of Japan. 
The siege of the castle was personally led by Ōuchi Yoshitaka against Gassantoda Castle located within Izumo Province, under the control of Amago Haruhisa.

In this battle Mori Motonari penetrated deep into the Amago clan territory but their supply line was broken and Kikkawa Okitsune (吉川興経) betrayed them. Motonari surrounded Gassantoda castle (富田城) but the Ōuchi troops retreated. During the retreat Motonari almost lost his life, but his general, Watanabe Hajime tried to sacrifice his life, so he can get away by fighting to the death. Motonari returned safely to Aki Province.

After a long, hard-fought siege, Haruhisa ended in victory, and as a result of the battle, the power of the Ōuchi clan weakened.

Yoshitaka, who had failed in his attempt, withdrew to Yamaguchi, in which he indulged himself with "more and more in pleasures", until he was deposed by his retainer, Sue Harukata, in the Tainei-ji incident.

References

1542 in Japan
1543 in Japan
Gassantoda Castle
Gassantoda Castle
Gassantoda Castle
Ōuchi clan